Port of Menteith railway station served the village of Port of Menteith, Stirling, Scotland, from 1856 by 1934 on the Forth and Clyde Junction Railway.

History 
The station was opened as Cardross on 26 May 1856 by the Forth and Clyde Junction Railway. Its name was changed to Port of Monteith on 1 May 1858 to avoid confusion with the station of the same name. The station building was at the east end of the westbound platform. To the south was the goods yard and at the east end of the station was the signal box, which opened in 1893. The station's name changed again to Port of Menteith in June 1880. It closed on 1 October 1934.

References 

Disused railway stations in Stirlingshire
Railway stations in Great Britain opened in 1856
Railway stations in Great Britain closed in 1934
1856 establishments in Scotland
1934 disestablishments in Scotland